Isidiella nickerlii is a moth in the family Cosmopterigidae. It is found in France, on the Iberian Peninsula and in Switzerland, Austria, Italy, the Czech Republic, Hungary, Romania and North Macedonia.

References

External links

lepiforum.de

Moths described in 1864
Cosmopteriginae
Moths of Europe